Aleksandr Yenko (born 17 August 1972) is a Moldovan athlete who specialized in the 110 metres hurdles.

He competed at the 1995 World Indoor Championships without reaching the final.

His personal bests are 13.58 seconds in the 110 metres hurdles, achieved in July 1995 in Gomel, and 7.84 seconds in the 60 metres hurdles, achieved in February 1995 in Sofia. Both are standing Moldovan records.

Competition record

References

1972 births
Living people
Moldovan male hurdlers
World Athletics Championships athletes for Moldova